Genji Umeno (梅野 源治) is a Japanese Muay Thai and Kickboxing practitioner. He is the current BoM Lightweight champion.

He is the former Rajadamnern 135 lbs champion, WPMF World Super Featherweight champion, WBC Muaythai World and International Super Featherweight champion, as well as the former M-1 Featherweight Champion.

Career beginnings
Genji Umeno grew up watching combat sports as a kid, which led him to become enthralled by the sport. When he first started his training at a young age, Umeno thought he would be World Champion easily, only to realize how good he would have to be. Instead of giving up, Umeno says he kept working at his skills to become the best he could be.

Umeno says he doesn't really have many hobbies outside of fighting and training.

Muay Thai career

Winning his first titles
Umeno made his professional debut in November 2007, against Hiroaki, winning by decision. Umeno was undefeated in his next eight fights, defeating Hiro, Okami and Hari Nagata by decision and Takaaki Sugano, Meechok Manopganchan, Yusuke Miho, Shinjin and Rajasaklek Sor Vorapin by (T)KO. He suffered his first professional loss to Norasing Kiatpurasanchai at REBELS 2, losing by decision. He rebounded from this loss with a second-round TKO of Yotonyot Ketsiripat. His 10–1 record earned him the chance to fight Yu Saenchaigym for the WPMF Japan Super Bantamweight title at REBELS 3. He won the fight by unanimous decision.

In his next fight, in September 2010, Umeno fought Egkarat for the WBC Muay Thai Japan Super Bantamweight title. He fought his third title fight in a row when he fought Kompayak Weerasakreck for the M-1 Featherweight title. He beat Kompayak by majority decision.

Umeno fought his next three fights with the REBELS organization, defeating Yuya Kiyokawa and Suwannoi Acegym by unanimous decision, and Kaichon Sit Tamsap by a third round low kick knockout. Moving to M-1, Umeno fought Wuttidet Lookprabat, defeating him by a fourth-round knockout. In November 2011, Genji fought Dekkamon Hiraigym for the WPMF World Super Featherweight title, and won by a first-round TKO. This victory was followed by a unanimous decision win against Yosuke Morii.

Lumpinee title fight
In his next fight, Umeno made his Lumpinee Stadium debut, fighting Kongnapa Sirimongkol. Kongnapa would win their fight by unanimous decision. He won his next two fights, before making his K-1 debut as well, being scheduled to fight Chan Hyung Lee. He lost the fight by decision. He rebounded by winning his next three fights, one of them being a rematch with Chan Hyung Lee at RISE 92. Following these three wins, Umeno went on a 2–1 run, that nonetheless earned him the chance to fight Stephen Meleady for the WBC Muay Thai International Super Featherweight title. He defeated Meleady by unanimous decision.

After drawing with the former Lumpini Stadium champion Singtongnoi Por.Telakun, he was scheduled to fight Jompichit Chuwattana for the WBC Muaythai World Super Featherweight title. He won the fight by unanimous decision.

After defeating Rungrat Naratrikul at NO KICK,NO LIFE 2015, Umeno was scheduled to fight Phetmorakot Wor Sangprapai for the prestigious Lumpinee Stadium 130 lbs title. Phetmorakot successfully defended his title through a decision win.

Rajadamnern title win
After failing to capture the title, Umeno went on the worst run of his career up to that point, going on a 5-3-2 run, losing both of his Rajadamnern Stadium fights. Following this run, he was scheduled to defend his WBC Muaythai title again Keith McLachlan. He defended the title with a second-round TKO.

After defending his title, Umeno was scheduled to fight Yodlekpet Or. Pitisak at REBELS.46 for the Rajadamnern 135 lbs title. Umeno won the most prestigious title of his career through a unanimous decision.

Following this title capture, Umeno won his next two fights, winning decision against Sirimongkol PKsaenchaimuaythaigym and Juan Mario Kaewsamrit. His eight fight undefeated streak was snapped by Rodlek Jaotalaytong at KNOCK OUT vol.2, as Rodlek won a majority decision. After losing to Rodlek, Umeno was scheduled to defend the Rajadamnern title against Sakmongkol Sor.Sommai. Sakmongkol won the fight by unanimous decision.

Umeno rebounded from this loss by defeating Suarek Rukkukamui and Inseetong Por.Phinaphat, before challenging Kulabdam Sor.Jor.Piek-U-Thai for the Lumpinee Stadium 135 lbs title at Rebels 54. Kulabdam won the fight, knocking Genji out in the fourth round.

RISE tournament and BoM title
In his next two fights, Umeno defeated Pinphet Sitjadaeng and Piëtro Doorjé, before dropping a majority decision to Kiatpet Peekmairestaurant, rebounding with a three fight winning streak during which he beat Jeong Kihan, Lu Jun and Gyudong Lee. He then entered the 2019 Rise World Series Super Featherweight tournament. In the semifinals, Umeno faced Chan Hyung Lee, whom he defeated by unanimous decision. In the finals, he fought Taiju Shiratori, and lost by knockout in the first round.

After losing the tournament finals, Umeno fought Sila YZD for the Battle of Muay Thai lightweight title. Umeno won the title with a first-round TKO of Sila.

Umeno next fought Norasing Specialgym at RISE Eldorado 2021. He won the fight by unanimous decision.

Umeno was scheduled to make the first defense of his BOM Lightweight title against Kiewsongsang Flyskygym, at BOM WAVE 04. The fight was a rematch, with Kiewsongsang winning their first fight at BOM WAVE03. He won the fight by unanimous decision.

Umeno faced Koji in the semifinal bout of a four-man tournament, held during the Rizin 29 – Osaka event. Leading into the fight with Kouzi, Umeno says his Thai boxing experience would not play a factor due to the rule differences between Muay Thai and kickboxing. 43 seconds into his fight with Koji, there was an inadvertent clash of heads which left Umeno unable to continue fighting. Umeno later revealed that he had suffered a broken nose due to the head clash.

Umeno was scheduled to face Lompet Y'zd at BOM – ouroboros 2021 – on September 26, 2021. He fight was ruled a majority draw.

Umeno was scheduled to face Taiga Kawabe at RISE World Series Osaka 2 on November 14, 2021. He lost the fight by unanimous decision.

Umeno fought a rematch with Kouzi at Rizin 34 – Osaka on March 20, 2022. He lost the fight by majority decision.

Umeno faced Trent Girdham in a kickboxing bout at Rizin 39 on October 23, 2022. He won the bout early in the first round after Girdham went down with a knee injury.

Titles and accomplishments

Kickboxing
RISE
 2019 RISE World Series -61 kg Tournament Runner-up

Muay Thai
The Battle of MuayThai
2019 BoM Lightweight Champion
Rajadamnern Stadium
 2016 Rajadamnern Stadium 135 lbs Champion
World Boxing Council Muaythai
 2010 WBC Muay Thai Japan Bantamweight Champion
 2014 WBC Muay Thai World Super Featherweight Champion
 2014 WBC Muay Thai International Super Featherweight Champion
World Professional Muaythai Federation
 2011 WPMF World Super Featherweight Champion
M-1 Muay Thai
 2010 M-1 Featherweight Champion

Awards
eFight.jp
2x Fighter of the Month (September 2011, April 2012)

Fight record

|-  style="text-align:center; background:#cfc"
| 2022-10-23 || Win || align=left| Trent Girdham || Rizin 39 || Fukuoka, Japan || TKO (Knee Injury)  || 1 || 0:21 
|-  style="text-align:center; background:#cfc"
| 2022-07-23 || Win || align=left| Shoji Otani || KNOCK OUT 2022 vol.4 || Tokyo, Japan || TKO (Doctor stoppage) || 3 ||2:57  
|-  style="background:#fbb;"
| 2022-03-20|| Loss || align=left| Kouzi || Rizin 34 – Osaka || Tokyo, Japan || Decision (Majority) || 3 || 3:00
|-  style="text-align:center; background:#fbb"
| 2021-11-14 || Loss || align=left| Taiga || RISE World Series 2021 Osaka 2 || Osaka, Japan || Decision (Unanimous) || 3 || 3:00 
|-  style="background:#c5d2ea;"
| 2021-09-26|| Draw|| align=left| Lompet Y'zd ||  BOM – ouroboros 2021 – || Tokyo, Japan || Decision  ||5  ||3:00
|-  style="background:#c5d2ea;"
| 2021-06-27|| NC||align=left| Kouzi || Rizin 29 – Osaka, Tournament Semifinal || Osaka, Japan || Doctor Stoppage (Head clash) || 1 ||
|-  style="background:#cfc;"
| 2021-04-11|| Win ||align=left| Kiewsongsang Flyskygym|| BOM WAVE 04 – Get Over The COVID-19 || Yokohama, Japan || Decision (Unanimous)  || 5 || 3:00 
|-
! style=background:white colspan=9 |
|-  style="background:#cfc;"
| 2021-02-28 || Win || align=left| Norasing Specialegym || RISE Eldorado 2021 || Yokohama, Japan || Decision (Unanimous) || 3 ||3:00
|-  style="background:#fbb;"
| 2020-12-06|| Loss ||align=left| Kiewsongsang Flyskygym ||The Battle Of MuayThai - BOM WAVE03 – Get Over The COVID-19-|| Yokohama, Japan || Decision (Unanimous)|| 5 || 3:00
|-  style="background:#cfc;"
| 2019-12-08||Win||align=left| Sila YZD || BOM 2-6～THE Battle Of Muaythai SEASON II vol.6 || Tokyo, Japan || TKO (Doctor Stoppage/Elbow) || 1 || 2:46
|-
! style=background:white colspan=9 |
|-  style="background:#FFBBBB;"
| 2019-09-16||Loss ||align=left| Taiju Shiratori || Rise World Series 2019 Final || Chiba (city), Japan || KO (Left Straight) || 1 || 
|-
! style=background:white colspan=9 |
|-  style="background:#cfc;"
| 2019-07-21|| Win ||align=left| Chan Hyung Lee || Rise World Series 2019 Semi Finals || Osaka, Japan || Decision (Unanimous)|| 3 || 3:00
|-  style="background:#cfc;"
| 2019-05-19|| Win ||align=left| Gyudong Lee || Rise 132 || Tokyo, Japan || TKO (Middle kick) || 2 || 2:45
|-  style="background:#cfc;"
| 2019-03-10|| Win ||align=left| Lu Jun || Rise World Series 2019 First Round || Tokyo, Japan || Decision (Unanimous) || 3 || 3:00
|-  style="background:#cfc;"
| 2018-12-05|| Win ||align=left| Jeong Kihan || REBELS.59 || Tokyo, Japan || Decision (Unanimous)|| 5 || 3:00
|-  style="background:#fbb;"
| 2018-10-08|| Loss ||align=left| Kiatpet Peekmairestaurant || REBELS.58 || Tokyo, Japan || Decision (Majority)|| 5 || 3:00
|-  style="background:#cfc;"
| 2018-08-03|| Win ||align=left| Piëtro Doorjé || REBELS.57 || Tokyo, Japan || TKO (Right Elbow)|| 3 || 0:50
|-  style="background:#cfc;"
| 2018-06-06|| Win ||align=left| Pinphet Sitjadaeng || REBELS.56 || Tokyo, Japan || Decision (Majority)|| 5 || 3:00
|-  style="background:#fbb;"
| 2018-02-18|| Loss ||align=left| Kulabdam Sor.Jor.Piek-U-Thai || Rebels 54 || Tokyo, Japan || KO (Punches) || 4 || 0:55
|-
! style=background:white colspan=9 |
|-  style="background:#cfc;"
| 2017-11-24|| Win ||align=left| Inseetong Por.Phinaphat || REBELS.53 || Tokyo, Japan || KO (Left Elbow)|| 4 || 0:31
|-  style="background:#cfc;"
| 2017-09-06|| Win ||align=left| Suarek Rukkukamui || REBELS.52 || Tokyo, Japan || Decision (Unanimous)|| 5 || 3:00
|-  style="background:#fbb;"
| 2017-05-17|| Loss ||align=left| Sakmongkol Sor.Sommai || Rajadamnern Stadium || Bangkok, Thailand || Decision (Unanimous) || 5 || 3:00 
|-  style="background:#cfc;"
! style=background:white colspan=9 |
|-  style="background:#fbb;"
| 2017-04-01|| Loss ||align=left| Rodlek Jaotalaytong || KNOCK OUT vol.2 || Tokyo, Japan || Decision (Majority) || 5 || 3:00
|-  style="background:#cfc;"
| 2017-02-12|| Win ||align=left| Juan Mario Kaewsamrit || KNOCK OUT vol.1 || Tokyo, Japan || Decision (Unanimous)|| 5 || 3:00
|-  style="background:#cfc;"
| 2016-12-05|| Win ||align=left| Sirimongkol PKsaenchaimuaythaigym || KNOCK OUT vol.0 || Tokyo, Japan || Decision (Unanimous)|| 5 || 3:00
|-  style="background:#cfc;"
| 2016-10-23|| Win ||align=left| Yodlekpet Or. Pitisak || REBELS.46 || Tokyo, Japan || Decision (Unanimous)|| 5 || 3:00 
|-  style="background:#cfc;"
! style=background:white colspan=9 |
|-  style="background:#cfc;"
| 2016-09-17|| Win ||align=left| Keith McLachlan || NJKF 2016 6th || Tokyo, Japan || TKO || 2 || 0:34 
|-  style="background:#cfc;"
! style=background:white colspan=9 |
|-  style="background:#cfc;"
| 2016-08-07|| Win ||align=left| Yasuyuki || REBELS.45 || Tokyo, Japan || Technical Decision (Majority) || 3 || 3:00
|-  style="background:#c5d2ea;"
| 2016-06-24|| Draw ||align=left| Yodwandee Nitisamui || RIKIX NO KICK NO LIFE～THE FINAL～ || Tokyo, Japan || Decision || 5 || 3:00
|-  style="background:#cfc;"
| 2016-05-01|| Win ||align=left| Chatchainoi Sor Jor Toipaetriw || Syu Ken 31  || Tokyo, Japan || TKO || 1 ||
|-  style="background:#c5d2ea;"
| 2016-03-12|| Draw ||align=left| Starboy KwaythongGym || NO KICK NO LIFE 2016 || Tokyo, Japan || Decision || 5 || 3:00
|-  style="background:#fbb;"
| 2015-12-23|| Loss ||align=left| Yodlekpet Or. Pitisak || Rajadamnern Stadium || Bangkok, Thailand || KO (Left Elbow) || 3 ||
|-  style="background:#cfc;"
| 2015-10-18|| Win ||align=left| Songkom Nayoksany || REBELS.39 || Tokyo, Japan || Decision (Unanimous)|| 5 || 3:00
|-  style="background:#fbb;"
| 2015-09-10|| Loss ||align=left| Saeksan Or. Kwanmuang || Rajadamnern Stadium || Bangkok, Thailand || Decision (Unanimous)|| 5 || 3:00
|-  style="background:#cfc;"
| 2015-07-20|| Win ||align=left| Petchboonchu Sor.Sommai || NJKF 2015 5th || Tokyo, Japan || KO (Right uppercut) || 3 || 2:13
|-  style="background:#cfc;"
| 2015-05-10|| Win ||align=left| Muangthai PKSaenchaimuaythaigym || Wanchai＋PK MuayThai Super Fight || Nagoya, Japan || KO || 4 || 1:09
|-  style="background:#fbb;"
| 2015-04-19|| Loss ||align=left| Phetmorakot Wor Sangprapai || WPMF JAPAN×REBELS.35 || Tokyo, Japan || Decision (Unanimous)|| 5 || 3:00
|- 
! style=background:white colspan=9 |
|-  style="background:#cfc;"
| 2015-02-11|| Win ||align=left| Rungrat Naratrikul || NO KICK NO LIFE 2015 || Tokyo, Japan || Decision (Unanimous)|| 5 || 3:00
|-  style="background:#cfc;"
| 2014-11-15|| Win ||align=left| Jompichit Chuwattana || NJKF 2014 8th || Tokyo, Japan || Decision (Unanimous)|| 5 || 3:00
|-  style="background:#cfc;"
! style=background:white colspan=9 |
|-  style="background:#c5d2ea;"
| 2014-09-21|| Draw ||align=left| Singtongnoi Por.Telakun || M-FIGHT Suk WEERASAKRECK VII || Tokyo, Japan || Decision || 5 || 3:00
|-  style="background:#cfc;"
| 2014-04-13|| Win ||align=left| Stephen Meleady || NJKF 2014 3rd || Tokyo, Japan || Decision (Unanimous)|| 5 || 3:00
|-
! style=background:white colspan=9 |
|-  style="background:#cfc;"
| 2014-02-11|| Win ||align=left| Pornsanae Sitmonchai || NO KICK NO LIFE 2014|| Tokyo, Japan || TKO (Doctor Stoppage) || 4 || 0:48
|-  style="background:#cfc;"
| 2013-11-17|| Win ||align=left| Kongsiam Tor Pitachai || M-FIGHT SUK WEERASAKRECK IV || Tokyo, Japan || KO (Right uppercut) || 3 || 1:25
|-  style="background:#fbb;"
| 2013-09-15|| Loss ||align=left| Kaew Fairtex || M-FIGHT SUK WEERASAKRECK III || Tokyo, Japan || TKO (3 knockdowns)|| 2 || 1:14
|-  style="background:#cfc;"
| 2013-06-16|| Win ||align=left| Rudpet Por Warasin || M-FIGHT SUK WEERASAKRECK II || Tokyo, Japan || KO || 1 || 2:01
|-  style="background:#cfc;"
| 2013-03-20|| Win ||align=left| Chan Hyung Lee || RISE 92 || Tokyo, Japan || Decision (Unanimous)|| 3 ||
|-  style="background:#cfc;"
| 2013-01-06|| Win ||align=left| Kim Seung Yeol || RISE 91/M-1MC || Tokyo, Japan || KO || 3 || 1:04
|-  style="background:#fbb;"
| 2012-10-14|| Loss ||align=left| Chan Hyung Lee || K-1 World Grand Prix 2012 in Tokyo Final 16 || Tokyo, Japan || Decision || 3 ||
|-  style="background:#cfc;"
| 2012-06-24|| Win ||align=left| Ankarnlek Excidicongym || M-1 Muay Thai Challenge Sutt Yod Muaythai vol.2 Part.2 || Tokyo, Japan || KO (Right Cross)|| 2 || 2:31
|-  style="background:#cfc;"
| 2012-04-15|| Win ||align=left| Kongnapa Sirimongkol || REBELS.11 || Tokyo, Japan || Decision (Unanimous)|| 5 || 3:00
|-  style="background:#fbb;"
| 2012-02-24|| Loss ||align=left| Kongnapa Sirimongkol || Lumpinee Stadium || Bangkok, Thailand || Decision || 5 || 3:00
|-  style="background:#cfc;"
| 2011-12-22|| Win ||align=left| Yosuke Morii || Fujiwara Matsuri 2011 Fuyu no Jin || Tokyo, Japan || Decision (Unanimous) || 5 || 3:00
|-  style="background:#cfc;"
| 2011-11-13|| Win ||align=left| Dekkamon Hiraigym || M-1 Muay Thai Challenge RAORAK MUAY FINAL || Tokyo, Japan || TKO (Right Elbow)|| 1 || 2:39  
|-
! style=background:white colspan=9 |
|-  style="background:#cfc;"
| 2011-09-11|| Win ||align=left| Wuttidet Lukprabat || M-1 FAIRTEX Muay Thai Challenge RAORAK　MUAY vol.3 || Tokyo, Japan || KO (Right Elbow)|| 4 || 2:23
|-  style="background:#cfc;"
| 2011-07-18|| Win ||align=left| Kaichon Sit Tamsap || REBELS.8 × IT'S SHOWTIME JAPAN countdown-1 || Tokyo, Japan || KO (Left Low kick) || 3 || 1:53
|-  style="background:#cfc;"
| 2011-04-24|| Win ||align=left| Suwannoi Acegym || REBELS.7 || Tokyo, Japan || Decision (Unanimous)|| 5 ||3:00
|-  style="background:#cfc;"
| 2011-01-23|| Win ||align=left| Yuya Kiyokawa || REBELS.7 || Tokyo, Japan || Decision (Unanimous)|| 3 ||3:00
|-  style="background:#cfc;"
| 2010-11-14|| Win ||align=left| Kompayak Weerasakreck || M-1 FAIRTEX SINGHA BEER Muay Thai Challenge NAI KANOMTOMvol.4 || Tokyo, Japan || Decision (Majority) || 5 ||3:00  
|-
! style=background:white colspan=9 |
|-  style="background:#cfc;"
| 2010-09-26|| Win ||align=left| Egkarat || WBC Muay Thai The Path to the World Champion || Tokyo, Japan || Decision (Unanimous)|| 5 ||3:00  
|-
! style=background:white colspan=9 |
|-  style="background:#cfc;"
| 2010-07-19|| Win ||align=left| Yu Saenchaigym || REBELS.3 || Tokyo, Japan || Decision (Unanimous)|| 5 ||3:00  
|-
! style=background:white colspan=9 |
|-  style="background:#cfc;"
| 2010-05-08|| Win ||align=left| Yotonyot Ketsiripat || Suk Fairtex || Tokyo, Japan || TKO || 2 ||
|-  style="background:#FFBBBB;"
| 2010-03-21|| Loss||align=left| Norasing Kiatprasanchai || REBELS.2 || Tokyo, Japan || Decision (Unanimous) || 5 || 3:00
|-  style="background:#CCFFCC;"
| 2010-01-23|| Win ||align=left| Rajasaklek Sor Vorapin || REBELS || Tokyo, Japan || TKO ||4  || 0:49
|-  style="background:#CCFFCC;"
| 2009-11-28|| Win ||align=left| Shinjin ||NJKF ROAD TO REAL KING 14 || Japan || TKO ||2 || 1:36
|-  style="background:#CCFFCC;"
| 2009-08-09|| Win ||align=left| Hari Nagata ||Muay Thai Wave from YOKOHAMA 8	 || Japan || Decision (Unanimous)||3 || 3:00
|-  style="background:#CCFFCC;"
| 2009-03-22|| Win ||align=left| Yusuke Miho ||NJKF GO FOR BROKE 〜ROAD TO REAL KING III || Japan || KO ||1 || 2:19
|-  style="background:#CCFFCC;"
| 2008-12-21|| Win ||align=left| Meechok Manopganchan || Daorung Chujaroen・UBC || Japan || KO ||2 ||
|-  style="background:#CCFFCC;"
| 2008-09-07|| Win ||align=left| Takaaki Sugano || J-NETWORK "J-FIGHT in SHINJUKU 〜vol.5〜" || Tokyo, Japan || KO ||2 || 0:54
|-  style="background:#CCFFCC;"
| 2008-05-18|| Win ||align=left| Okami || J-NETWORK "J-FIGHT 21" || Japan ||Decision ||3 || 3:00
|-  style="background:#CCFFCC;"
| 2008-02-21|| Win ||align=left| Hiro ||TRIBELATE vol.16 || Japan ||Decision ||3 || 3:00
|-  style="background:#CCFFCC;"
| 2007-11-11|| Win ||align=left| Hiroaki ||M-1 FAIRTEX Freshmans in Oomori || Japan ||Decision ||3 || 3:00
|-
| colspan=9 | Legend:

Exhibition record

|-
|Loss
|align=center|0–1
|Ren Hiramoto
|KO (left hook)
|Bellator MMA vs. Rizin
|
|align=center|2
|align=center|3:00
|Tokyo, Japan
|Special standing bout. Boxing rules with spinning back fist allowed.

See also
 List of male kickboxers
 List of WBC Muaythai world champions

References 

1988 births
Living people
Japanese kickboxers
Japanese Muay Thai practitioners
Sportspeople from Tokyo
Bantamweight kickboxers